Leandro Nunes Velicka (born February 26, 1986 in São Paulo), commonly known as Velicka, is a Brazilian footballer.

He is an extremely versatile player who can play in multiple roles such as a right or left back, and defensive or a centre midfielder.

Career
Velicka played in 2016 for Oeste in the Brazilian Série B due to a partnership between Audax and Oeste.

Career statistics

References

External links

1986 births
Living people
Brazilian footballers
Footballers from São Paulo
Association football defenders
Association football midfielders
Association football utility players
Campeonato Brasileiro Série B players
Campeonato Brasileiro Série C players
Grêmio Barueri Futebol players
Tupi Football Club players
Atlético Monte Azul players
Mirassol Futebol Clube players
Clube Atlético Sorocaba players
Clube Atlético Linense players
São José Esporte Clube players
Comercial Futebol Clube (Ribeirão Preto) players
Esporte Clube Noroeste players
Grêmio Osasco Audax Esporte Clube players
Guaratinguetá Futebol players
Oeste Futebol Clube players
Associação Ferroviária de Esportes players
Centro Sportivo Alagoano players
Grêmio Esportivo Brasil players
Esporte Clube Taubaté players
Esporte Clube Água Santa players